Das Buch (literally The Book) is the twelfth album released by German rock band Puhdys. It was recorded, produced, and released in 1984.

The album 
Das Buch was released as an LP (8 56 039) and Vinyl (056 039) for Amiga. The retail price of the LP was, as usual, 16.10 East German marks.

The title track is placed as the last title on page 1. It deals with the fear of nuclear war and its consequences for the population of the earth. Influenced by the current zeitgeist (tightening of the Cold War, a boycott of the Olympic Games in Moscow by many Western countries, further increase of the arms race between the Soviet Union and the United States) succeeds to be to them with this title an impressive warning against escalation. Anthemic sounds like the song, with the support of the FDJ from the Choir School of East Berlin.

Track list
"1984"

"Ich will nicht vergessen"

"Die Wärme der Nacht"

"Der Angstverkäufer"

Die Boote der Jugend

Das Buch

"Rockerrente"

"Niemand wird so wieder werden"

"Bauernhochzeit"

"Schlaf mit mir"

Das Märchen

Credits 

 Chorus of the Free German Youth in EOS "Immanuel Kant" Berlin with Title 6
 René Decker: tenor saxophone with Title 5 and 8
 Arndt Bause: brass arrangement to Title 9
 Helmar Federowski music and sound direction
 Karl-Heinz Ocasek: Production
 Volkmar Andrae: Production

References

External links
 Official website of the Puhdys

1984 albums